Roy "Tiger" Bence (1 April 1900 – 3 October 1979) was an Australian rules footballer who played with South Melbourne and St Kilda in the Victorian Football League (VFL).

Originally from Koroit, Bence was a rover and occasional forward pocket. He started his league career at South Melbourne but after only one season left for Brighton. His second attempt at establishing himself in the VFL was more successful. He played nine seasons for St Kilda, before retiring at the age of 33.

References

1900 births
1979 deaths
Australian rules footballers from Victoria (Australia)
Sydney Swans players
St Kilda Football Club players
Brighton Football Club players
Koroit Football Club players